Aamir Saleem (Punjabi, born 20 February 1958 in Multan, Pakistan) is a Pakistani singer, composer, songwriter, host and music video director who had several hits in the early 1990s, including "Woh Taron Bhari", "C.B. Chali Ana", and "Ajnabi".

He has worked as a director for music videos and road shows with anchor Ali Salman on MTV Pakistan, under the name of Bad Company. He hosted live shows on FM 107, FM 100 (Karachi). He also hosted a live show on PTV National for more than 8 years. He was the singer of the first title song for Geo TV program Hum Sub Umeed Se Hain. He has also acted in the telefilm Daira on Geo TV. His last releases were a Sufi song especially made for Ramadan titled "Jindri" and a song on Mothers day by the name of Maa.

Biography

Early life
Aamir Saleem started singing when he was in school and he bought his first guitar after working in a hotel as a receptionist in summer holidays. He formed his first music band with the name "Image", his best friend Naveed Mugees was on guitar and Alim Arshid was on keyboard. After that he moved to Karachi in 1986. He used to sing with different bands to make money and record his first solo album that took three years to complete.

Discography

Albums

Notable songs

Single(s)

References

External links 

 Official Aamir Dailymotion channel

Living people
Pakistani male singers
Pakistani pop singers
1958 births